The 2004–05 Football League Trophy, known as the LDV Vans Trophy for sponsorship reasons, was the 22nd season in the history of the competition. A straight knockout competition for English football clubs in the third and fourth tiers of the English football league system.

In all, 60 clubs entered the competition. It was split into two sections, Northern and Southern, with the winners of each section contesting the final at the Millennium Stadium, Cardiff. The competition began on 28 September 2004 and concluded on 10 April 2005.

The winners were Wrexham, who defeated Southend United 2–0.

First round
The First Round ties took place on 28 and 29 September 2004. Four clubs received a bye into the Second Round. Oldham Athletic and Tranmere Rovers in the Northern section, and Northampton Town and Swindon Town in the Southern section.

Northern section

Southern section

Second round
The Second Round ties took place on 2 and 3 November 2004.

Northern section

Southern section

Quarter finals
The Quarter final ties took place on 30 November 2004.

Northern section

Southern section

Semi finals
The Semi final ties took place on 25 January 2005.

Northern section

Southern section

Area Finals

Northern section

Southern Section

Final

References

External links
Official website

EFL Trophy
Trophy
Trophy